Marx Rumpolt  (* est. 1525; †1593 in Aschaffenburg) was head cook to the Elector of Mainz, Daniel Brendel of Homburg. His cookbook, Ein new Kochbuch (lit. "A New Cookbook"), written in 1581, was the first textbook for professional chefs in training.

Before Rumpolt came to the court of the Elector of Mainz, he worked for several other European nobles and thus came to learn of the cuisines of different regions, such as Bohemia and Hungary. A year before the death of his master, the Elector of Mainz, Rumpolt wrote his cookbook, which consisted of 2,000 recipes and instructions for wine making and 150 woodcuts by Jost Amman.

Rumpolt's cookbook was, like all cookbooks for that period, intended for aristocratic kitchens only.

References
 
 Ein new Kochbuch, Frankfurt 1581.

External links
"Ein new Kochbuch" - Bibliographic information.
"Ein new Kochbuch"  - Scanned copy by the Herzog August Bibliothek Wolfenbüttel.
Cooking Rumpolt translation project on Facebook

German chefs
16th-century German people
Year of death unknown
Year of birth unknown